Lozzolo is a comune (municipality) in the Province of Vercelli in the Italian region Piedmont, located about  northeast of Turin and about  north of Vercelli.

Lozzolo borders the following municipalities: Gattinara, Roasio, Serravalle Sesia, Sostegno, and Villa del Bosco.

Demographic evolution

Twin towns — sister cities
Lozzolo is twinned with:

  Castiglione d'Adda, Italy

References

External links
 www.comune.lozzolo.vc.it/

Cities and towns in Piedmont